Murat Jašarević (born 18 March 1969) is a Bosnian retired football player.

Club career
After leaving Croatian top tier-side Pazinka Pazin he had spells with several clubs in Germany.

International career
Jašarević made his debut for Bosnia and Herzegovina in a November 1996 friendly match away against Italy and has earned a total of 5 caps, scoring no goals. His final international was a September 1997 World Cup qualification match against Slovenia.

References

External links

Profile - NFSBIH

1969 births
Living people
Footballers from Sarajevo
Association football defenders
Yugoslav footballers
Bosnia and Herzegovina footballers
Bosnia and Herzegovina international footballers
FK Goražde players
FK Sarajevo players
NK Pazinka players
MSV Duisburg players
Hannover 96 players
FSV Zwickau players
Wuppertaler SV players
FC Erzgebirge Aue players
Yugoslav First League players
Croatian Football League players
Bundesliga players
2. Bundesliga players
Regionalliga players
Oberliga (football) players
Bosnia and Herzegovina expatriate footballers
Expatriate footballers in Croatia
Bosnia and Herzegovina expatriate sportspeople in Croatia
Expatriate footballers in Germany
Bosnia and Herzegovina expatriate sportspeople in Germany